Nazareth Hall Preparatory Seminary (known also as Naz Hall) was a high school seminary in Saint Paul, Minnesota serving the Archdiocese of Saint Paul and Minneapolis. It was founded in 1923 by Archbishop Austin Dowling and was closed in 1971, being replaced by Saint John Vianney Seminary. The campus is now the site of the University of Northwestern – St. Paul.

History

Background 
Prior to the founding of Nazareth Hall, high-school and early college-aged seminarians for the Archdiocese of Saint Paul were educated at a number of institutions. Many of the first seminarians of the diocese were personally tutored by bishop Joseph Crétin and other clerical teachers in the newly completed rectory of the Cathedral of Saint Paul. After the opening of St. John's College in 1867, most minor seminarians for the Diocese were educated there or at other seminary institutions in the United States or in Europe. However, Thomas Grace hoped that eventually a dedicated college for the Diocese would be founded, and in November 1866 purchased forty acres on the shores of Lake Johanna with the hope it would eventually become a seminary.

Grace's successor, John Ireland, took office in June 1884, and in December of that same year announced plans to build a seminary for the Diocese, which would become the University of St. Thomas. The fledgling college was not unique among Catholic institutions of its time in that it functioned as a sort of combination theological seminary, minor seminary, junior college, high school, and junior high school.

Founding 
Following Bishop Ireland's death in 1918, Austin Dowling became Archbishop of St. Paul, and began to plan to separate the preparatory seminary from the College of St. Thomas, envisioning a secluded rural institution at the Lake Johanna property that would aid in recruiting both priestly candidates and financial supporters. On the first anniversary of the death of Archbishop John Ireland,  Dowling established a fund to finance the building of a preparatory seminary. In the fund, $1,280,000 was raised specifically for the construction and endowment of the seminary. These plans were announced to the public in 1920, with the Romanesque-style campus estimated to cost $500,000 to construct, and planned to house 250 persons. The cornerstone of the new complex was laid by Dowling on May 21, 1922 and completed and dedicated by September 1923.

The redirection of diocesan funds and the withdrawal of minor seminarians had a major negative impact upon the still-young College of Saint Thomas, as the 140 high-school age seminarians moving from St. Thomas to Nazareth Hall constituted nearly twenty percent of the student body at this time. Some within the diocese thought that the establishment of Nazareth Hall spread the resources of the diocese too thinly. Additionally, many criticized the separation of high-school age aspirants to the priesthood as undesirable.

Operation 
Timothy Crowley was the first rector of the seminary from 1923 to 1935. In its first year, there were 125 students. In the early years, the school struggled financially, operating at a deficit according to a 1929 report.

Despite this, Dowling was resistant to hearing any criticism of his project, and furnished a personal suite at the school for his frequent retreats and visits there. As one priest of the Archdiocese stated: "Nazareth Hall was the apple of his eye and woe betide the priest or layman who dared to utter an uncomplimentary syllable about the institution, its architecture, purpose, faculty or product. Every other institution in the diocese was a stepchild, seldom visited except officially."

Nazareth Hall covered six years of education - four years of high school and the first two years of a bachelor's degree in philosophy. The second two years of undergraduate philosophy and then four years of masters-level theology were done at Saint Paul Seminary. Coursework for the students included classes in Latin, Gregorian chant, math, the sciences, and social studies. Not all students who attended Nazareth ended up becoming priests, and so over time seminary leadership worked to make the curriculum suitable preparation for life outside of the priesthood.

The Sisters of Saint Francis (OSF) assisted with the domestic operations of the seminary and lived in one of the wings of the building.

By 1949, the institution had 226 students and over 185 alumni had been ordained to the priesthood for the Archdiocese of Saint Paul and Minneapolis; 70 had been ordained for other dioceses, one to the Ruthenian Greek Catholic Church (Stephen Kocisko) and 13 for religious orders.

In 1962, St. Austin's House (now called Riley Hall) was added on to the main complex due to growth in the seminary body throughout the 1950s.

Closing and acquisition by the University of Northwestern 
In 1959, Archbishop William Brady ordered a feasibility study for a "4-4-4" plan for priestly formation: four years of study at Nazareth Hall, four years of study at the College of Saint Thomas, and four years of study at the Saint Paul Seminary. This plan was overwhelmingly supported. However, due to declining enrollment after the Second Vatican Council, by 1967 the 4-4-4 plan seemed no longer feasible and there was a stronger desire to create a college seminary at the University of St. Thomas and close Nazareth Hall. In 1968, enrollment fell from 148 the prior year to 105 with the opening of Saint John Vianney College Seminary. It was closed in 1971 and the land and buildings sold for $1,100,000 to Northwestern College (now the University of Northwestern). This decision was negatively received by the clergy of the diocese, especially the perceived low sale price, which was seen as the seminary being "given away."

Over 3,000 students attended Nazareth Hall during its forty-eight years of operation.

The University of Northwestern presently uses the buildings for academic and administrative uses, and has preserved much of the campus in its original state.

Buildings 

The campus of Nazareth Hall, which is still maintained and is in active use by the University of Northwestern – St. Paul., primarily consists of "six buildings in one." The "Lombard Romanesque" chapel, residence wings, and classrooms are all interconnected across 120,752 square feet.

Our Lady of the Annunciation Chapel 

The chapel is named for Our Lady of the Annunciation and was consecrated on September 8, 1924. It originally sat 300 people and has a crypt church underneath where daily Masses were said. The square bell tower is 105 feet tall. The lower portion of the chapel walls are made from red Numidian marble from Africa. Gray marble columns support the tile vaulted ceiling. While the apse dome is has since been painted white, it was originally gold leaf.

The pews have since been replaced by the University of Northwestern. The space, since renamed Nazareth Chapel by the University of Northwestern, is a popular wedding venue.

Many original decorations of the chapel remain such as the Stations of the Cross. A number of artifacts from the seminary are in active use in Catholic churches across the St. Paul area. The altar and baldachin of the seminary chapel are at St. Michael's Church in St. Michael, Minnesota; the chapel statues of Mary and Joseph are at St. John Vianney Seminary; a lectern is at All Saints in Minneapolis; some kneelers, chairs and vestments are at St. Agnes in Frogtown.

Mater Dei Chapel 

There is a small chapel, formerly called Mater Dei Chapel in an island in the middle of Lake Johanna. It was originally built in 1925 as a crypt for Heiress Wilhelmine Coolbaugh, who donated the money for its construction herself, with the approval of Archbishop Dowling. However, since then her remains have been removed and reinterred at Resurrection Cemetery in Mendota Heights.

The exterior of the chapel is made with limestone, and above the entrance is a mosaic of an angel holding a scroll with the words "EGO MATER PULEBRAE DELECTIONIS ET TIMORIS ET AGNITIONIS ET SANCTAE SPEI" in Latin, meaning "I am the mother of beautiful delight and of reverence and of knowledge and of holy hope."

The interior walls are also limestone with a marble floor. Prior to the sale of the seminary, there were stained glass windows and a triptych of the Archangel Gabriel inside, bearing the Latin inscription "REGINA ANGELORUM ORA PRO NOBIS" ("Queen of the Angels, pray for us"). The triptych above the altar, "The Adoration of the Peasants," was by American painter and muralist Frank H. Schwarz. The stained glass windows and triptych were removed after the sale.

Notable alumni 

 James Byrne, auxiliary bishop of St. Paul (1947–1956), bishop of Boise (1956–1962), archbishop of Dubuque (1962-1983)
 Robert James Carlson, auxiliary bishop of Saint Paul and Minneapolis (1983–1994), bishop of Sioux Falls (1995–2004), bishop of Saginaw (2004-2009), and Archbishop of Saint Louis (2009-2020)
 Paul Vincent Dudley, auxiliary bishop of Saint Paul and Minneapolis (1977-1978), and bishop of Sioux Falls (1978–1995)
 Hilary Baumann Hacker, bishop of Bismarck (1957-1982)
 Michael Joncas, Catholic priest and composer, best known for his hymn, "On Eagle's Wings"
 John Francis Kinney, auxiliary bishop of Saint Paul and Minneapolis (1976-1982), bishop of Bismarck (1982-1995), and bishop of St. Cloud (1995-2013)
 Stephen Kocisko, first Metropolitan Archbishop of the Byzantine Catholic Metropolitan Church of Pittsburgh, the American branch of the Ruthenian Greek Catholic Church (1967–1990)
 Raymond Alphonse Lucker, auxiliary bishop of Saint Paul and Minneapolis (1971-1976) and bishop of New Ulm (1976-2000)
 Ralph McInerny, American novelist 
 Richard Pates, auxiliary bishop of Saint Paul and Minneapolis (2000-2008), bishop of Des Moines (2008-2019)
 John Roach, auxiliary bishop of Saint Paul and Minneapolis (1971-1975), and archbishop of Saint Paul and Minneapolis (1975–1995)
 Peter P. Stumpf Jr., American politician and businessman

Rectors 
 Father Timothy Crowley: 1923-1935
 Father John Cullinan: 1935-1940
 Father James Connolly: 1940-1943
 Father Thomas Shanahan: 1944-1948
 Father Louis McCarthy:  1949-1959
 Father James Cecka: 1959-1960
 Father John Sankovitz: 1961-1965
 Father Richard Moudry: 1965-1970

References

External links 
 unwsp.edu/about-us/history-heritage/nazareth-hall/

Roman Catholic Archdiocese of Saint Paul and Minneapolis
Catholic seminaries in the United States
Catholic seminaries
Catholic priesthood
Religious organizations established in 1922